Ronald Stevens (2 September 1925 – 11 November 2006) was an English revue artist, character actor and voice artist credited professionally as Ronnie Stevens.

Life and career
Stevens was born in London, England, the son of Fanny Elizabeth (Carpenter) and Henry Edward Stevens. He served in World War II in both the Royal Air Force (RAF) and the Royal Engineers of the British Army. 

He appeared in many television comedy series in regular roles, including May to December, Goodnight Sweetheart and A J Wentworth, BA.  He also appeared as the "Minister of Pollution", in The Goodies pollution episode. He played minor roles in many other sitcoms including Wild, Wild Women, Winning Widows, Only When I Laugh, Ever Decreasing Circles, Hi-de-Hi!, Yes, Prime Minister, Terry and June, Chance in a Million and As Time Goes By. He played roles in The Avengers, Dick and the Duchess, Minder, Rumpole of the Bailey, Hetty Wainthropp Investigates, and as Sir Andrew Aguecheek in the 1980 BBC Television Shakespeare series presentation of Twelfth Night. He appeared as Mr Rudge in the Tales of the Unexpected (TV series) episode (9/5) "The Facts of Life" (1988).

In 1965–66 Stevens co-starred in the pioneering Australian TV satirical comedy series The Mavis Bramston Show, where he replaced founding cast member Gordon Chater.

Stevens also appeared in the 1962 film Carry On Cruising, the 1996 film Brassed Off, and the 1998 film The Parent Trap.

He co-narrated Noggin the Nog with Oliver Postgate.

Stevens also lent his voice to the classic children's puppet series Space Patrol and Sara and Hoppity and the children's animated series Captain Zed and the Zee Zone along with various British and Canadian voice actors as well as providing voices for the animated film Rarg.

Personal life 
His wife, Ann, predeceased him as did his older son Paul. He is survived by their younger son Guy. Ronald was 81 at the time of his death.

Filmography

References

External links

Obituary in The Stage
Daily Telegraph obituary

1925 births
2006 deaths
English male film actors
English male television actors
Male actors from London
English male voice actors
Royal Air Force personnel of World War II
British Army personnel of World War II
Royal Engineers soldiers